Mario Schaden (born 30 April 1972) is an Austrian ice hockey player. He competed in the men's tournaments at the 1998 Winter Olympics and the 2002 Winter Olympics.

Career statistics

Regular season and playoffs

International

References

External links
 

1972 births
Living people
Olympic ice hockey players of Austria
Ice hockey players at the 1998 Winter Olympics
Ice hockey players at the 2002 Winter Olympics
People from Zeltweg
Sportspeople from Styria